William Groombridge  may refer to:

William Ironside Groombridge, secretary of English football club Gillingham/New Brompton
William Groombridge (painter)

See also
Groombridge (disambiguation)